The 800 class were a class of diesel locomotives built by English Electric, Rocklea for the South Australian Railways in 1956/57. They were nearly identical to the earlier Jamaican Railways 81 class.

History
The 800 class were diesel shunter locomotives operated by the South Australian Railways. Although built for shunting duties in Adelaide, they also operated trip workings between Dry Creek and Mile End, pick up trains around Port Adelaide and passenger services. In March 1978 all were included in the transfer of the South Australian Railways to Australian National.

In 1986, a new computer system required the class leaders of the former South Australian Railways to be renumbered as the last member of the class, with 800 becoming 810. They were withdrawn in the early 1990s.

One (801) has been preserved by the National Railway Museum, Port Adelaide.

Model railways
SDS Models produced an HO scale 800 class locomotive in 2019 in a wide range of liveries.

References

Bo-Bo locomotives
English Electric locomotives
Railway locomotives introduced in 1956
800
Broad gauge locomotives in Australia
5 ft 3 in gauge locomotives
Diesel-electric locomotives of Australia